Voissay is a commune in the Charente-Maritime department in southwestern France.

Geography
The river Boutonne forms all of the commune's northern border.

Population

See also
Communes of the Charente-Maritime department

References

Communes of Charente-Maritime